Steinheim is a town in Höxter district in North Rhine-Westphalia, Germany.

The middle centre of Steinheim forms the economic, cultural and social hub of the Steinheimer Börde, one of the main territories of the old Prince-Bishopric of Paderborn. This territory was known as Wethi-Weizengau in Saxon times. Particularly scenic are the foothills of the Eggegebirge.

Geography

Location 
Steinheim lies roughly 15 km southeast of Detmold. The town belongs to the district of Höxter and is situated in the north-eastern part of the federal state of North Rhine-Westphalia.

Constituent communities 
The greater town of Steinheim consists of the main town of Steinheim and eight outlying villages: 
Bergheim 
Eichholz
Grevenhagen 
Hagedorn
Ottenhausen 
Rolfzen
Sandebeck
Vinsebeck

History 
Steinheim was granted town rights in 1275 by Simon I, Bishop of Paderborn.

Main sights
The Steinheim Catholic Parish Church of Saint Mary (Katholische Pfarrkiche St. Marien Steinheim).
The Town Hall, built in 1835, is a plain, two-storey plaster building in late Classicist forms.
The rectory (Pfarrhaus), a two-storey half-timbered house with a half-hipped roof, was built in 1729. 
The so-called Paradieshof (Detmolder Str. 24) was formerly the episcopal financial officer's (Rentmeister) seat. It was built in 1729 with a half-hipped roof. Renovated in 1995-96, the building has been used since that time as a kindergarten, daycare centre and shelter on the parental initiative Klabautermann e.V.
The nearby Rentmeisterhaus (Detmolder Str. 28) presents itself as a late Baroque heptaxial plaster (half-timbered?) building with middle risalit and Mansard roof. It was built in 1767. It still has its original front door.
In the town core after the renovations in the 1970s and 1980s, only a few older residential houses had been kept. As a rule, this usually meant plain half-timbered Dielenhäuser (wide, open houses with a high hallways) almost all of which had been built after the devastating town fire in 1729. Especially well preserved is Rochusstraße 22, a half-timbered Dielenhaus from 1729.
Of the town wall, built beginning in 1280, one rather lengthy stretch has been preserved on the street "Hinter der Mauer" ("Behind the Wall").

Cultural events 
Steinheim's Rosenmontagszug – a colourful parade – is the biggest and oldest in the East Westphalia-Lippe region. Also, the Steinheim shooting festival, held every year in early summer, enjoys great popularity.

Politics

Town council 

Town council's 26 seats are apportioned as follows, in accordance with municipal elections held on 26 September 2004:
CDU 12 seats
SPD 6 seats
Greens 3 seats
UWG 5 seats
Note: UWG is a citizens' coalition.

Mayors 
At the 2015 municipal elections, the new mayor Carsten Torke (CDU) was elected with an absolute majority, succeeding the previous mayor Joachim Franzke (CDU). Torke was re-elected in 2020.

Coat of arms 
Steinheim's civic coat of arms might heraldically be described thus: In argent a wall with three crenellated towers, the middle tower higher than the two flanking, gules, in the wall below the middle tower a gate Or.

Steinheim's oldest town seal, from the 15th century, shows the wall with the three towers, but not the gate. The wall and towers have figured on all seals since that time, but some seals showed the gate, and others did not. Arms were officially granted the town on 23 March 1908, and showed only the wall and towers, not the gate. On 22 March 1971, the town adopted a new coat of arms whose composition was roughly the same, but it included a narrow green chief (stripe across the top). These arms soon yielded to the present arms when a disagreement arose over the new arms, with the council opposing the new blazon that included the green chief.

The current arms were adopted on 3 July 1972.

Economy and infrastructure

Transport 
Owing to Steinheim's advantageous location on the north-south-running East Westphalia Road (Ostwestfalenstraße), otherwise known as Federal Highway (Bundesstraße) B252, connections to the B1 (Paderborn-Ruhr area) and Autobahnen A 2 (Hanover-Ruhr area) and A 44 (Dortmund-Kassel) are right at hand.

Steinheim can also be reached by rail throughout the day, with hourly trains from both Hanover and Paderborn.

Education 
Steinheim has several kindergartens and daycare centres, two primary schools, one special school,  a Realschule and a Gymnasium. Till 2011 Steinheim also had a Hauptschule.

Town partnerships 
Steinheim maintains partnership links with the following places  :
  Busko-Zdrój, Poland
  Haukipudas, Finland
  Kalemie, DRC
  Specchia, Italy
  Szigetszentmiklós, Hungary

References

External links 
  
 Steinheim Evangelical Parish
 Steinheim fire brigade

Towns in North Rhine-Westphalia
Höxter (district)